Omoba Yinka Mursiq Durosinmi  (born 25 June 1961) is a Nigerian politician and former Chairman of Ojo local government area of Lagos State.

Early life and education
Yinka Durosinmi was born into the royal family of Osolu Kingdom in Irewe, a town in Ojo, Lagos State. He attended his basic education in Apapa Baptist Secondary School, Apapa and his secondary school education at Awori College, Ojo and went on to obtain his National Diploma and Higher National Diploma in Business Administration from Lagos State College of Science and Technology, Isolo now Lagos State Polytechnic. He also holds a Masters in Legal Studies, Administration Law and Public Policy from Lagos State University, Ojo.

Politics
Yinka was the former Chairman of Ojo local government area till 2014 when he decided to contest as a representative for Ojo constituency in the Nigerian National Assembly under the platform of the All Progressives Congress. He went on to lose the election after Tajudeen Obasa emerged winner.

Personal life
Yinka is the son to Alhaji Remilekun Durosinmi, an All Progressives Congress leader in the Ojo/Badagry axis of Lagos State. His sister Princess Sarah Sosan is a former Deputy Governor of Lagos State. He is married with children.

References

1961 births
Living people
Yoruba politicians
Lagos State University alumni
Yoruba royalty
All Progressives Congress politicians
Lagos State politicians
Lagos State Polytechnic alumni